Komerční banka (“KB”) is a major Czech bank and the parent company of KB Group, a member of the Société Générale international financial group. KB is a universal bank providing a wide range of services in retail, corporate and investment banking complemented by specialised financial services produced by KB’s subsidiaries or other SG Group companies. KB Group operates in the Czech Republic and also provides services to corporate clients in Slovakia. It serves more than 1.6 million customers in 399 branches.

All of the services are accessible through the dense network of KB branches, its own distribution network, and on-line services, such as internet banking.

Service for corporate clients of Komerční banka is provided by two segments, usually according to annual turnover (sales) and number of products used. Companies with turnover from CZK 60 million to 1500 million are generally served by the Corporate sales centers. Clients with a higher turnover are usually served by the Top Corporations divisions, which are located in Prague, Brno and Bratislava.

History
The bank was founded in 1990 following separation of commercial activities from the former State Bank of Czechoslovakia. In 1992, the bank was partially privatized in voucher privatization.

In 2001, the state’s 60% holding in Komerční banka was purchased by Société Générale. Following privatization, KB began significantly to develop its activities for individual customers and entrepreneurs, in addition to building on its traditionally strong position in the enterprises and municipalities market.

In 2014 the Komerční banka signed a partnership with the National Gallery in Prague.

In 2021, the bank had 241 branches and operated 857 ATMs.

Sponsoring
Komerční banka has been a partner of institutions, projects and events of society-wide importance for many years. It focuses on culture, non-professional sport and education. Support for Czech culture is the main area of the bank’s sponsorship. Komerční banka has been the general partner of the National Theatre, the most important Czech theatrical institution, for more than ten years. The bank has been supporting the French Film Festival for the same time. Since 2014, it has also been a partner of the National Gallery in Prague.

Komerční banka Jistota Foundation
The Jistota Foundation has been supporting projects in the areas of social and health care services for over 20 years while focusing on senior citizens and children. In 2014, it supported 99 projects, mainly through financial support from the Bank and its associated companies but also thanks to employee initiatives. In addition to their donating money, the employees also constitute the Foundation’s management and supervisory boards. The Foundation’s donations in 2014 exceeded CZK 9 million.

Awards 
In 2004, 2005 and 2007 Komerční banka received the Bank of the Year Award from the Mastercard company.

The Best Bank of the Year 2017 in the Czech Republic was Komerční banka.

See also

 List of banks in Europe#Czech Republic

References

Banks of the Czech Republic
Companies based in Prague
Banks established in 1990
1990 establishments in Czechoslovakia
Privatized companies in the Czech Republic
Czech brands
Société Générale